The Pacific War Museum is on Guam.  It contains exhibits related to the military in the Pacific theater of World War II with a focus on the U.S. Marines.  Marine Corps Vietnam War veteran John Gerber established the museum. In 2011, the museum won the prestigious Colonel John H. Magruder III Award from the Marine Corps Historical Foundation.

See also
History of the United States Marine Corps
Marine Corps Museums
National Museum of the Pacific War

Notes

External links
Pacific War Museum National Park Service official website

Education in Hagåtña, Guam
Marine Corps museums
Military and war museums in insular areas of the United States
Museums in Guam
World War II museums